The Morlachs were a group of Vlachs in modern-day Croatia and Bosnia who were known under such name.

"Morlach" or similar terms might also refer to:

 Morlachia, a historical region in Europe inhabited by Morlachs in the past
 Morlachs (Venetian irregulars), a former Venetian irregular military group
 Morlachism, a literary movement that consisted on the interest in the Morlachs by European writers
 Morlacco, an Italian cheese named after the Morlachs

See also
 Morlacchi, the Italian name of the Morlachs that may refer to an Italian surname or the Teatro Morlacchi at Perugia
 Istro-Romanian (disambiguation)

Language and nationality disambiguation pages